The Faroe Islands Super Cup (in Faroese: Stórsteypadystur, or simply Stórsteypið) is a football competition contested between the Faroe Islands Premier League champions and the winners of the Faroe Islands Cup from the previous season.

History
The Super Cup was introduced in 2007 as the Lions Cup (named after the charity organization Lions Club) and is now an annual event. All proceeds from the matches are donated to charity. Since its creation, the Super Cup officially opens the season of Faroese football.

Editions

2007

2008

2009

2010

2011

2012

2013

2014

2015

2016

2017

2018

2019

2020

2021

2022

Notes

Winners

All-time top scorers

See also
Atlantic Cup
Faroe Islands Cup
Faroe Islands Premier League

References

2
Faroe Islands
Lions Clubs International